The 1973 Brownlow Medal was the 46th year the award was presented to the player adjudged the fairest and best player during the Victorian Football League (VFL) home and away season. Keith Greig of the North Melbourne Football Club won the medal by polling twenty-seven votes during the 1973 VFL season.

Leading votegetters

References 

1973 in Australian rules football
1973